Myths of the Hindus & Buddhists (1913) is a book written by Sister Nivedita and Ananda K. Coomaraswamy.

Background 
Responding to the call of Swami Vivekananda, Sister Nivedita travelled to India in 1898. Josephine MacLeod, a friend and devotee of Swami Vivekananda asked him how best she could help him and got the reply to "Love India". Nivedita wrote multiple books on Indian history, culture, Vedic religion, Hinduism, Buddhism, etc.

Myths 
In this book the author included and narrated some myths and stories from ancient Hindu and Buddhist literature. The book includes a good number of water colour illustrations which were created under the supervision of Abanindranath Tagore. Tagore himself drew some of the pictures in the book.

The myths and stories of this book include–
 Mythology of the Indo-Aryan Race
 Ramayana
 Mahabharata
 Krishna
 Buddha
 Shiva
 Other stories from Puranas, epics and Vedas

References

External links 
 Full book at Archive.org

Books by Sister Nivedita
1913 books
English-language books
20th-century Indian books